The World Scrabble Championship 2003 was held in the Corus Hotel, Kuala Lumpur, Malaysia. The winner was Panupol Sujjayakorn of Thailand.

The format was notably different from previous WSCs. The tournament began with the Australian Draw system, with each player playing sixteen games over two days. On the third day the players played eight games in a King Of the Hill format. After this, the top two players competed in a best-of-five final to decide who would be the seventh World Scrabble Champion.

Prize money started at $17,500 for the winner, with all the top twenty players receiving prizes down to $200.

Results

The winner was Panupol Sujjayakorn of Thailand. This was the first time that a player won the WSC while representing a country for which English is not the first language.

Complete Results

FINALS:
Game 1: Panupol 418 – Pakorn 380
Game 2: Pakorn 495 – Panupol 384
Game 3: Pakorn 514 – Panupol 470
Game 4: Panupol 446 – Pakorn 433
Game 5: Panupol 444 – Pakorn 387

References 

2003
2003 in Malaysian sport
2000s in Kuala Lumpur